Thundergun, thunder gun may refer to:
 brand name of impact tools made by Ingersoll Rand Industrial Technologies
 fictional gun featured in Call of Duty: Black Ops videogame Zombies mode 
 a fictional movie franchise in the sitcom It's Always Sunny in Philadelphia 
 a type of fictional character in Isle of Swords
 donrebusse (thunder-gun), another term for blunderbuss